The Farsi toothcarp (Aphanius farsicus) is a species of pupfish belonging to the family Cyprinodontidae. It is endemic to the Maharlu Lake Basin in Iran, residing in springs, lagoons, and marshes containing fresh to brackish water.

Etymology 
The species name, farsicus, refers to the Fars Province, where the fish is found. It was originally known as Aphanius persicus, but the name was changed in late 2011 when it was discovered the name was already being used by a Late Miocene fossil called Brachylebias persicus.

Description 
Farsi toothcarp reach approximately 4.9 cm in length. Like all members of its genus, the fish show sexual dimorphism. Females have numerous alternating light and dark bars, which gradually merge with the pigmentation on the rest of their bodies. The caudal fin spot has been recorded to be elongate, oval, or teardrop-shaped, but is almost always in the form of a lozenge.

Males, on the other hand, are similar in coloring to Aphanius sophiae, bearing light flank bars narrower than the alternating dark bars. The dorsal, anal, and caudal fins all have clear margins, whereas the rest of the fins are dark.

References 

Aphanius
Fauna of Iran